Leiningen may refer to:

 Leiningen, Germany
 Principality of Leiningen (former country; 1803-1806)
 House of Leiningen
 Leiningen, the protagonist of the 1938 short story, "Leiningen Versus the Ants" by Carl Stephenson
 Leiningen (software), a build automation tool for the Clojure programming language